Paterson is a 2016 drama film written and directed by Jim Jarmusch. The film stars Adam Driver as a bus driver and poet named Paterson, and Golshifteh Farahani as his wife, who dreams of being a country music star and opening a cupcake business.

Paterson was selected to compete for the Palme d'Or at the 2016 Cannes Film Festival, where it won the Palm Dog Award. It was released in Germany on November 17, 2016, by K5 International; in France on December 21, 2016, by Le Pacte; and in the United States on December 28, 2016, by Amazon Studios and Bleecker Street.

Plot
The film spans one week, beginning with Monday, in the life of Paterson, a NJ Transit Bus Operations driver in Paterson, New Jersey. Every day follows much the same pattern: Paterson gets up early and goes to work, where he listens to passengers talking and, during pauses, writes poetry in a notebook he carries with him. After work he walks Marvin, his wife's dog, and stops for a beer at Shades Bar, where he interacts with the other patrons and the owner, Doc (Barry Shabaka Henley).

Paterson's wife, Laura, loves his poems and is apparently their only audience. She has long urged him to publish them or at least make copies. He finally promises to go to the copy shop on the weekend. But when Paterson and Laura come home from a movie on Saturday night, they find that Marvin has shredded his notebook, destroying his poems.

The next day, a dejected Paterson goes for a walk and sits down at his favorite site, the Great Falls of the Passaic River. There, a Japanese man (Masatoshi Nagase) takes a seat beside him and begins a conversation about poetry after Paterson notices that the man is reading the book-length poem Paterson by William Carlos Williams. The man seems to know that Paterson himself is a poet even though he denies it and hands him a gift, an empty notebook. The film ends with Paterson writing a poem in his new notebook.

Cast

Production
In April 2014, it was announced that Jim Jarmusch would write and direct a film about a poet living in Paterson, New Jersey. In January 2016, it was revealed that Adam Driver and Golshifteh Farahani had been cast in the film, with Oliver Simon and Daniel Baur serving as executive producers under their K5 Film banner, while Joshua Astrachan and Carter Logan would produce under their Animal Kingdom and Inkjet banners respectively.

The film was shot over 30 days in fall 2015, in Paterson, New Jersey, and various locations in New York. Adam Driver obtained his commercial bus driver's license for the film.

The poet Ron Padgett provided the poems attributed to the character Paterson, while Jarmusch wrote the poem "Water Falls" attributed to a young girl in the film. The film features four of Padgett's existing poems and three new poems written for the film.

Release

The film had its world premiere on May 16, 2016, at the 2016 Cannes Film Festival, where it competed for the Palme d'Or. Amazon Studios distributed the film in the United States. It was later announced that Bleecker Street was partnering with Amazon on releasing the film, on December 28, 2016. It was released in Germany on November 17, 2016 and in France on December 21, 2016. It opened for a limited run in the eponymous city on January 27, 2017.

Critical reception
On the review aggregator website Rotten Tomatoes, the film has an approval rating of 96%, based on 256 reviews, with an average rating of 8.49/10. The site's critical consensus reads, "Paterson adds another refreshingly unvarnished entry to Jim Jarmusch's filmography—and another outstanding performance to Adam Driver's career credits." On Metacritic, the film has a score of 90 out of 100, based on 41 critics, indicating "universal acclaim".

Todd McCarthy of The Hollywood Reporter gave the film a positive review, writing of Jarmusch: "A mild-mannered, almost startlingly undramatic work that offers discreet pleasures to longtime fans of the New York indie-scene veteran, who can always be counted on to go his own way." Eric Kohn of Indiewire also gave the film a positive review, writing: "But Paterson has too much clarity of mind to fall into a similar category. The story builds to an accidental circumstance that, on the surface, might not seem like a big deal—but in the context of Paterson’s tiny universe, resonates with tragic connotations. The brilliantly cryptic finale explores what it means to work back from personal setbacks to find a new source of inspiration. It’s an apt statement from Jarmusch, a filmmaker who continues to surprise and innovate while remaining true to his singular voice, and who here seems to have delivered its purest manifestation." David Edelstein noted the film's unreality, writing: "What Jarmusch hasn't attempted in his Paterson is to explore the part of the city that was called, when Williams wrote about it, 'the slums.' Perhaps he felt that abject poverty wouldn't suit his slightly ironic distance, that it would rip the film's fragile fabric. It might have, but without that edge this Paterson comes close to seeming twee, like one of Wes Anderson's dollhouse communities. The poems make all the difference, transforming the most amorphous yearnings into something hard and beautiful and real."

Accolades

References

External links
  Average of viewer ratings is 7.3 out of 10.
 
  96% of published reviews are favorable.
  Paterson has "universal acclaim" from film critics.

2016 films
2016 drama films
2016 independent films
American drama films
German drama films
French drama films
English-language German films
English-language French films
Amazon Studios films
Bleecker Street films
Films set in New Jersey
Films shot in New Jersey
Paterson, New Jersey
Films directed by Jim Jarmusch
Films about buses
Films about poets
Films set in a movie theatre
2010s English-language films
2010s American films
2010s French films
2010s German films